"I'm Walkin'" is a 1957 song by Fats Domino, written together with frequent collaborator Dave Bartholomew. The single was Domino's third release in a row to reach No. 1 on the R&B Best Sellers chart, where it stayed for six weeks. It also broadened the singer's crossover appeal, peaking at No. 4 on the pop singles chart. The prominent saxophone solo was played by Herbert Hardesty.  Lee Allen was also on sax, Frank Fields on bass, Earl Palmer on drums, and Walter "Papoose" Nelson on guitar.

Notable cover versions
Later in 1957, Ricky Nelson covered a crossover version of the song on an episode of The Adventures of Ozzie & Harriet; the single was released on Verve Records and reached No. 4 on the pop chart and No. 10 on the R&B chart. Its B-side was "A Teenager's Romance".  After several Verve singles, Nelson also recorded for Imperial Records, the same label Domino was on at the time.
In 1961, the song re-charted as one of three songs in the "New Orleans Medley" by session drummer Earl Palmer, reaching No. 108 in the Music Vendor survey.
In 1961, Nancy Sinatra performed the song on a television show. The song was later released on the album Bubblegum Girl Vol. 2 in 2005
In 1975, J. D. Crowe & The New South recorded a cover on their album J. D. Crowe & The New South
In 1996, John Paul Young covered the song on his album, Now (1996).
In 2007, Tom Petty and the Heartbreakers covered the song on the tribute album Goin' Home: A Tribute to Fats Domino (Vanguard).

In popular culture
The song was featured in 1980 film The Blues Brothers, during the scene in which the orphanage kids help spread the word of the band's revival concert.
Domino's version is heard in a 2016 TV commercial for Fitbit Alta.

References

1957 songs
1957 singles
Songs written by Fats Domino
Songs written by Dave Bartholomew
Fats Domino songs
Ricky Nelson songs
Imperial Records singles